J. W. Schull (1849 – July 30, 1876) was an American sailor who was the first victim and believed source of the yellow fever that struck the United States in the summer of 1876. In the six-week period following his infection, around five thousand of Savannah, Georgia's approximately 28,000 residents had fled the city to escape the disease.

Background 
"There was no yellow fever in the United States in the summer of 1876 before it appeared in Savannah. The disease, therefore, must have been imported there or have originated in that city," stated Surgeon General of the United States Army Alfred A. Woodhull, M.D., four years later in the pages of the American Public Health Association's Public Health Papers and Reports, Volume 5. His study was titled May Not Yellow Fever Originate in the United States?: An Etiological Study of the Epidemic at Savannah in 1876. It was read at the seventh annual meeting of APHA in Nashville, Tennessee, on November 20, 1879.

Investigation 

Woodhull reported that "a careful inquiry" had pinpointed Delaware native Schull, the steward of the schooner F. A. Server, as the primary case of the disease's outbreak. Schull's vessel had arrived in Savannah from New York City, laden with coal (or ice, according to another source), on July 10, 1876. Schull fell sick while aboard just under two weeks later, on July 23. He was taken ashore to the boarding house of Mrs. Hearn, on Indian Street at the corner of Ann Street, on July 25. After receiving treatment from a doctor, William Duncan, who diagnosed congestive fever, Schull stayed there for three days, before being moved to Savannah's Marine Hospital. In the meantime, Mrs. Hearn's son-in-law David Coleman, slept in the bed Schull had been using. He left for Darien, Georgia, on August 16 and, two days later, endured a four-hour fever. He survived and returned to Savannah on August 19.

Yellow fever was not diagnosed in Schull by the surgeon in charge at the Marine Hospital before Schull was discharged from its wards; it only became evident in retrospect.

On August 17, Thomas Magner Jr., a child living at his family's grocery store on the opposite corner of Ann Street from the boarding house, was attacked by the disease, which then "spread rapidly in every direction from that centre."

It is believed that the disease could not have been contracted by Schull anywhere but aboard the Server since he had been attached to that vessel for just over a year, during which time it remained solely in United States waters. Some claim Schull boarded the neighboring vessel, "consorting intimately with her cook, for the sake of cigars", but both its captain and crew denied this.

Schull's death 
Schull died on July 30, 1876, aged 27. Whilst "sitting up in bed calm and cheerful, he was taken with sudden hemorrhage. The blood escaped from his mouth in quantities, was red and frothy, and death ensued almost immediately." An autopsy undertaken four hours later recorded that Schull had yellow skin, lungs filled with blood, traces of incipient tubercles in the lungs, with ulcers on their exterior, and his liver was a "complete boxwood color."

He was interred in Savannah's Laurel Grove Cemetery.

References 

1849 births
1876 deaths
American sailors
19th-century American people
Deaths from yellow fever
People from Delaware